Born Innocent may refer to:

 Born Innocent (film), a 1974 NBC television movie
 Born Innocent (The Proclaimers album), the fifth album by The Proclaimers released in 2003
 Born Innocent (Redd Kross album), the debut album by Red Cross released in 1982
 Born Innocent (Alcatrazz album), the fourth album by Alcatrazz released in 2020